Wassand Hall is a large Regency house situated to the west of Hornsea, East Riding of Yorkshire, England, overlooking Hornsea Mere, which is part of its estate. The hall was designated a Grade II* listed building in March 1952 and is now recorded in the National Heritage List for England, maintained by Historic England. The Hall contains a collection of 18th and 19th Century paintings, English and Continental Silver, furniture, and a collection of porcelain.

The estate has been in the possession of the Constable family since about 1520. It was rebuilt in 1815 during the Regency period, the original house having been demolished because it had fallen into disrepair. Ownership passed to a widow, Lady Ernestine Strickland-Constable in 1975. Upon her death in 1995, the estate became held by her great-nephew, Rupert Russell, who resides at Wassand Hall with his wife Catherine.

During World War II, the house was requisitioned by the army and was used by the Free French.

Open days 
The house is not open full-time to the public, but details of Open Days can be found on the Wassand Hall website.

References

External links

Official site

Country houses in the East Riding of Yorkshire
Grade II* listed buildings in the East Riding of Yorkshire
Hornsea
Historic house museums in the East Riding of Yorkshire